Ammaiyappan is a 1954 Indian Tamil-language film written by M. Karunanidhi and directed by A. Bhimsingh in his directorial debut. The film stars S. S. Rajendran, G. Sakunthala and S. Varalakshmi. It was released on 24 September 1954 and became a major breakthrough in the career of Bhimsingh.

Plot

Cast 
Cast according to the song book

Male cast
 S. S. Rajendran as Muthan
 D. V. Narayanaswami as Velaizhagan
 D. Balasubramaniam as Balathevar
 V. K. Ramasami as Maigai Nada Swamigal
 M. R. Saminathan as Ghost
 M. N. Krishnan as Sukhadev
 M. A. Ganapathi as Thirusangu
 K. A. Ramakrishnan as Bhoopathi
 P. S. Dakshinamoorthi as Prankster
 E. Krishnamoorthi as Businessman
 Master Muthumanikkam as Businessman's Child

Female cast
 S. Varalakshmi as Poongavanam
 G. Sakunthala as Muthayi
 K. Rathnam as Sumathi
 Saraswathi as Rani
Male support cast
 N. S. Nagarajan, Stunt Krishnan,P. A. Dakshinamoorthi, and Nagoor Hanifa.

Production 
Ammaiyappan marked the directorial debut of A. Bhimsingh. It was produced by National Pictures, written by M. Karunanidhi, and featured S. S. Rajendran as the male lead, with G. Sakunthala as his love interest. Shooting took place at the studios Newtone and Citadel in Chennai (then known as Madras). Cinematography was handled by G. Vittal Rao.

Music 
The music of the film was composed by T. R. Pappa, with lyrics by Karunanidhi, Suratha, M. K. Athmanathan and N. M. Muthukuttan.

Reception 
Ammaiyappan was released on 24 September 1954. Though the film became a breakthrough in the career of Bhimsingh it was an utter failure. Writing for The Hindu, film historian Randor Guy praised the "alliterative Tamil dialogue" by Karunanidhi, and the performance of Rajendran.

References

External links 
 

1954 drama films
1954 films
1950s Tamil-language films
1954 directorial debut films
Films directed by A. Bhimsingh
Films scored by T. R. Pappa
Films with screenplays by M. Karunanidhi
Indian drama films